Yvonne Ångström (born 1940) is a Swedish Liberal People's Party politician. She was a member of the Riksdag from 1998 to 2006.

References

1940 births
21st-century Swedish women politicians
Living people
Members of the Riksdag 1998–2002
Members of the Riksdag 2002–2006
Members of the Riksdag from the Liberals (Sweden)
Place of birth missing (living people)
Women members of the Riksdag